Passion: Even So Come is a live album by Passion. Sixstepsrecords released the album on March 17, 2015. This album was produced by Nathan Nockels.

Critical reception

In a three and a half star review in CCM Magazine, Matt Conner comments that the "legacy continues". Kevin Davis from New Release Tuesday gave the album four and a half stars, calling the songs "catchy, exciting and worshipful." In a three and a half star review at Jesus Freak Hideout, Alex Caldwell writes, "The Passion conferences and their accompanying music, like any artistic enterprise, have their high and low points, but thankfully, Even So Come has many more of the former than the latter." Matt McChlery scored the album eight out of ten in a review for Cross Rhythms, stating "'Even So Come' captures the sound of a generation of student worshippers and continues the established Passion tradition of containing songs that draw people into the presence of God." Designating the album a 4.5 out of five for Christian Music Review, Jay Heilman declares, "Even So Come will go far in bringing together the masses in absolute worship, but most importantly, it paints a beautiful picture of how wonderful Jesus is and brings Him the honor and glory He truly deserves." Jono Davies, in appraising the album five stars by Louder Than the Music, describes, "This album has so many great songs and if I'm being honest, this really might be Passion's most complete album yet." Awarding the album nine out of ten stars in The Front Row Report, Reggie Edwards says, "Each song flows perfectly into the next and it’s a perfectly-constructed worship experience." Leah St. John, giving the album three and a half stars from Christian Review Magazine, writes, "Even So Come didn't really strike a chord". Rating the album four and a half stars at 365 Days of Inspiring Media, Joshua Andre says, "Louie Giglio and sixsteps Records have done a fantastic job!"

Accolades
The album reached No. 7 on Worship Leaders Top 20 Albums of 2015 list.

The song "Even So Come" reached No. 5 on Worship Leaders Top 20 Songs of 2015 list.

Track listing

Charts

References

2015 live albums
Passion Conferences albums
Live Christian music albums